The Dr. George Fennemore House, at 90 S. 100 West in Beaver, Utah, was built in 1898.  It was listed on the National Register of Historic Places in 1980.

It is vernacular in style, but it has a mansard roof, suggestive of Second Empire style.

See also
James Fennemore House

References

		
National Register of Historic Places in Beaver County, Utah
Second Empire architecture in Utah
Houses completed in 1898